Bradford William Anderson (born September 21, 1979) is an American actor best known for his role as the young hacker criminal Damian Millhouse Spinelli (a.k.a. The Jackal), on the television soap opera General Hospital, a part which he originated in November 2006 and has continued to play until the present, on both General Hospital and the Summer 2007 spin-off General Hospital: Night Shift.

Biography
Anderson is a native of Meredith, New Hampshire, the son of Bill Anderson and Noni Smith. His mother, who worked at local theater companies, encouraged both him and his sister Jennifer to get involved in acting. Anderson's first experience was at age six, playing Tiny Tim in a professional production by the Laconia Street Car Company of "A Christmas Carol". He also worked at Mames Restaurant for a few summers. The owner, John Cook, has commented that he "always knew Brad was going places." As a junior at Inter-Lakes High School, he landed a part in a local production of Joseph and the Amazing Technicolor Dreamcoat, which involved his spending time at a Summer Theater camp with many much older actors. He decided he liked the life, and began studying drama in earnest. Anderson graduated in 1998, and was voted in the high school yearbook as "Best singer", "Most dramatic", and "Most likely to succeed." He attended the Tisch School of Performing Arts at New York University, and while with the Philadelphia Theater Company, won an award as Best Supporting Actor for his role as Billy in Edward Albee's The Goat...Or Who Is Sylvia?

In mid-2005, he moved to Los Angeles, where he obtained a recurring part on Veronica Mars and began performing in other television shows as well. In September 2006, General Hospital put out a casting call for a "college-aged kid" who was a cross between Seth Green and Spicoli, a character played by Sean Penn in Fast Times at Ridgemont High. Anderson won the part, and the character, chattering a rapid-fire mix of surfer lingo and internet slang, has offered an interesting element to the show, and has been called "one of the quirkiest characters daytime has ever seen."  The role was initially just meant to be played on a recurring basis, but the character proved so popular that Anderson was offered a multi-year contract, which was signed in May 2007. His image was added to the opening credits sequence on July 6, 2007.

He hosted his own web show for SOAPNET called "camera ready".

Anderson cites influences from Johnny Depp, Gary Oldman, Don Knotts and Justin Long.

Bradford also recently appeared in a commercial for Dunkin' Donuts Sobe Coolatta.

Bradford has done some work with charities including the Manchester Animal Shelter in his home state of New Hampshire. He also returned to his hometown Meredith, to give a speech at Inter-Lakes High School's graduation for the class of '08.

Anderson also plays in the rock group "Port Chuck" along with General Hospital co-stars Steve Burton, Scott Reeves, and Brandon Barash.

Personal life
He married Kiera Mickiewicz in April 2010. The couple have two children, daughters Juna Meredith Anderson (born July 18, 2011) and Finola Leo Anderson (born May 2, 2014).

Roles

Television
Homeland (2017) - Trent
Castle (2014) - Dwight CarruthersNCIS: Los Angeles (2013) - Val WinklerPerception (2012) - Shane FlanneryGeneral Hospital: Night Shift (2007) - Damien SpinelliGeneral Hospital (2006–) (recurring) - Damien SpinelliWhat About Brian (2006) - DoctorVeronica Mars (2005;2006) - RyanEd (2007) - Nerd #1

FilmAmerican Pie Presents: Beta House (2007) - Jake ParkerCarts (2007) - EdKissing Cousins (2007) - Justin

Theater
 The Goat...Or Who Is Sylvia, as Billy
 Babes in Arms,  as Valentine
 She Loves Me, as Arpad
 William Faulkner's "Blood of the Bear"

Awards and nominations

References

External links
 
 General Hospital cast list
 Bradford Interview: Bradford Teases Storyline Plot

 "Hunting for Faulkner" review
 "Blood of the Bear" review, Show Business Weekly Review of "The Goat"
 "Local actor makes the grade: Meredith native Bradford Anderson lands recurring role on daytime soap", January 28, 2007, Foster's Daily Democrat "Soap stars to visit campus", February 22, 2007, Alligator Online "Making the Rounds at General Hospital", February 26, 2007, Blogcritics Magazine''

 Bradford Anderson on Myspace
 TV.com bio

1979 births
American male stage actors
Living people
Male actors from New Hampshire
American male soap opera actors
People from Meredith, New Hampshire
Tisch School of the Arts alumni